Erol Can Akdağ (born 18 August 1996) is a Turkish professional footballer who plays as a defensive midfielder for Tuzlaspor on loan from Giresunspor.

Career
A youth product of Giresunspor, Akdağ signed his first professional contract with the club in 2015 and began his senior career with successive loans to Çankaya and Ağrı 1970. He returned to Giresunspor for the 2020-21 season in the TFF First League. He made his professional debut for Giresunspor in a 2–1 Süper Lig loss to Fenerbahçe on 23 September 2021.

References

External links
 
 

1996 births
People from Giresun
Living people
Turkish footballers
Association football midfielders
Giresunspor footballers
Tuzlaspor players
TFF First League players
Süper Lig players
TFF Third League players